Out of the Pit is the first studio album by Canadian heavy metal band Kobra and the Lotus. Released on April 22, 2010, it was originally produced by Greg Godovitz of Goddo, the vocals, mix and final production was redone by Iron Maiden producer Kevin Shirley prior to release.

Background 
The album is a concept album that discusses working through roadblocks that life places in the paths of people, and not being impeded by them.

Track listing 
 It's Yours (4:42)
 FOCFOM (4:29)
 Cynical Wasteland (5:03)
 Teaspoon of Metal (3:33)
 Ballad of Jane Doe (5:38)
 The Hooker (2:55)
 Snake Pit (5:28)
 Ride Like Sugar (3:17)
 Ace of Spades (Motörhead Cover) (3:38)
 Legend (8:00)

Credit

Personnel
Kobra Paige - lead vocals
Matt Van Wezel - rhythm guitar
Ben Freud - bass
Chris Swenson - lead guitar
Griffin Kissack - drums

Additional personnel
Rik Emmett - additional guitars
Kevin Shirley - producer, vocal recording
Greg Godovitz - producer
Nick Blagona - additional production, engineering, mixing on track 10

References

External links

2010 debut albums
Kobra and the Lotus albums